Hajiyeh Seyyedeh Nosrat Begum Amin, also known as Banu Amin, Lady Amin (1886–1983), was Iran's most outstanding female jurisprudent, theologian and great Muslim mystic (‘arif) of the 20th century, a Lady Mujtahideh. She received numerous ijazahs (permissions) of ijtihad, among them from Ayatollahs Muḥammad Kazim Ḥusayni Shīrāzī (1873-1947) and Grand Ayatullah ‘arif (1859-1937), the founder of the Qom seminaries (hawza).

She also granted numerous ijazahs of ijtihad to female and male scholars, among them Sayyid Mar'ashi Najafi.

She wrote several books about Islamic sciences, among them a tafsir in 15 volumes, and established a maktab in Isfahan in 1965, called Maktab-e Fatimah. The maktab was directed since its inception until 1992 by Banu Amin's most prominent student, Zīnah al-Sādāt Humāyūnī (b. 1917). After 1992, Ḥajj Āqā Ḥasan Imāmi, a relative of Humāyūnī’s, took over the directorship.

Banu Amin was born into a merchant family. Nuṣrat Amīn’s husband was her cousin Haj Mirza, also known as Muīn al-Tujjar. Her father is known by the name of Haj Sayyid Muḥammad ʿAlī Amīn al-Tujjar. His sister Hāshimīyah al-Tujjar was a mujtahidah herself who received ijtihād degrees in fiqh and uṣūl. Further, Nuṣrat Amīn had a niece, Iffat al-Zamān Amīn (1912-1977), also known as Iftikhār al-Tujjar, who was one of her most prominent students and who received an ijazah of riwāya in Najaf by Ayatullah Mahmoud Hashemi Shahroudi.

Banu Amin had eight children, only one of whom survived her (Sayyid Muḥammad ʿAlī Muʿīn Amīn). She was buried at the Takht-e Fulad Cemetery in Isfahan.

Works 
 al-Arbaʿīn al-Hāshimīyyah
 Jā̄miʿ al-shatāt
 Al-Nafaḥāt al-Raḥmānīyah fī al-Vāridāt al-Qalbīyah
 Sayr va Sulūk dar Ravish-i Awliyāʼ-i Allāh
 Akhlāq va Rahi Sa‘adat: Iqtibas va tarjamih az Taharat al-Iraqi Ibn Maskuyih
 Ravish-i Khushbakhtī va Tawsīyih bih Khāharān-i Imani 
 Makhzan al-ʿirfān dar ʿulūm-i Qurʾān
 Makhzan al-laālī dar fazīlat-i mawlá al-mawālī hazrat-i Alī ibn Abītālib
 Maʿād, yā Ākharīn Sayr-i Bashar

Biographies and documentation 
  ʻAmū Khalīlī, Marjān. Kawkab-i durrī: [sharḥ-i ahvāl-i bānū-ye mujtahidah Amīn], (Tehran: Payām-e ʻAdālat, 1379 [2000]).
 Bāqirī Bīdʾhindī, Nāṣir. Bānū-yi nimūnah: gilwahāyī az ḥayāt-i bānū-yi mujtahidah Amīn Iṣfahānī, (Daftar-i Tablīqat-i Islāmī-yi Ḥawzah-yi ʿilmīyah-yi - Islamic Propagation Office of the Religious Seminaries Qom), Markaz-i Intishārāt, Qom 1382 [2003].
 Tayyibī, Nāhīd. Zindagānī-yi Bānū-yi Īrānī: Bānū-yi Mujtahidah Nuṣrat al-Sādāt Amīn, (Qom: Sābiqūn Publishers, 1380 [2001]). 
 Majmūʻah-ʾi maqālāt wa sukhanrānīhā-yi avvalīn wa duvumīn Kungrih-ʾi Buzurgdāsht-i Bānū-yi Mujtahidah Sayyidah Nuṣrat Amīn (rah), Markaz-i Muṭālaʻāt wa Taḥqīqāt-i Farhangī, Daftar-i Muṭālaʻāt-i Farhangī-i Bānūwān, Qom, 1995 (1374).
 Yādnāmah-i bānū-yi mujtahidah Nuṣrat al-Sādāt Amīn: mashhūr bih Bānū-yi Īrāni, (Isfahan: Vizārat-i Farhang wa Irshād-i Islāmī; Markaz-i Muṭālaʿāt-i wa Tahqīqāt-i Farhangī, 1371 [1992]).

Further reading

See also
Hāshimīyah al-Tujjar
Zohreh Sefati
Iftikhār al-Tujjar
Zīnah al-Sādāt Humāyūnī

References and notes

External links
 Lady Nusrat Beygum Amin's biography, Al-Islam.org

1886 births
1983 deaths
20th-century Muslim theologians
Iranian women writers
Iranian writers
Women scholars of Islam
Iranian Shia scholars of Islam
Iranian Muslim mystics
Female Shia scholars of Islam
Female Islamic religious leaders
Female Sufi mystics
Muslim scholars of Islamic jurisprudence